Gregory Mertl is an American composer that has garnered commissions from the Tanglewood Music Center (1999), the Rhode Island Philharmonic (2000), the Tarab Cello Ensemble (2001), the Phoenix Symphony (2001), the Wind Ensembles of the Big Ten Universities (2002), the Ostrava Oboe Festival, Czech Republic (2005, 2009), Kenneth Meyer and the Hanson Institute (2006), the University of Oregon (2013), CSTMA (2013), counter)induction (2016), the University of Niš (2016), and the Barlow Endowment for a piano concerto for pianist Solungga Liu and the University of Minnesota Wind Ensemble, Craig Kirchhoff, conductor, which was premiered in November, 2011 and released by Bridge Records (BRIDGE 9489) in May 2017.

In 2010, Mertl presented work on a concert/lecture tour in Romania and Hungary and as a guest composer at KOFOMI (Komponistenforum Mittersill, Austria) where he had performances by the Austrian contemporary music ensemble "Die Reihe". Previously his music has reached audiences in France, at the Festival du Moulin d’ands and the France Musique radio station, Belgium, where he placed third at the Harelbeke International Wind Ensemble Composition Competition (2004), and the Czech Republic, where he was featured composer of the Ostrava Oboe Festival in both 2005 and 2009. In Asia, the Tainan Women’s College of Arts and Technology hosted a two-day conference featuring Mertl’s music in May 2005 and lectures and performances followed at several other Taiwanese universities. His music has also been performed in China, Japan, Singapore, Sweden, Canada, Mexico and Brazil. In the US, it has been heard widely (New York City, Chicago, Boston, Rochester, Honolulu, Baltimore, Tanglewood, Colgate, Northwestern, Yale, and Princeton Universities, and Vermont Public Radio during a two-hour program dedicated to his work). In 2007, Open Gate, an ensemble he co-founded, performed an entire evening of his chamber music on a tour that culminated at Weill Recital Hall in New York City.

Born in 1969, Mertl has degrees from Yale University (BA 1991) and the Eastman School of Music (Ph.D. in Music Composition 2005). He has been full-time Visiting Artist of Composition at the Setnor School of Music at Syracuse University (2008-2010) and has been composer-in-residence at Yaddo, Château de La Napoule in France, the Fundación Valparaiso in Spain, the Helen Wurlitzer Foundation in Taos, New Mexico, the Ragdale Foundation, the Virginia Center for the Creative Arts, the I-Park Artists Enclave in East Haddam, CT, and the Chamber Music Festival of the East at Bennington College in Vermont. He has won major awards such as the Chicago Symphony’s First Hearing Award and a 1998 Tanglewood Composition Fellowship. At Tanglewood, he studied with Henri Dutilleux and Mauricio Kagel.

In November 2014, Mertl presented his music at the University of São Paulo and at the University of Campinas in Brazil. In 2015 he was performed in Virginia, North Carolina, and Oklahoma and in two Open Gate showcases at the Tenri Cultural Institute in New York City. During the summer and fall of 2015 he was resident composer at the Oberpfälzer Künstlerhaus in Schwandorf, Germany and he was guest of honor at the Balkan Art Forum 2015 in Niš, Serbia where he gave the keynote address and presented his music. In April and May 2016, he returned to Brazil for performances, lectures and masterclasses at universities in São Paulo, (UNESP and USP), Goiâna (UFG), Porto Alegre (UFRGS), and Pelotas (UFPEL).

His most recent residency was in October 2017 in Vigoulet-Auzil, France where he presented his work at the end of his stay in a concert-lecture format. He returns to VCCA in January 2018 and to Brazil for another tour of universities in May and June.

Of his Bridge release, the American Record Guide has written, “there’s a wealth of compositional ingenuity and detail, but better yet there’s what I might call attention to the human aspect of music—a concern with drama, passion, and psychological complexity alongside any purely technical achievement. That’s what makes me keep listening to it,” to which Fanfare Magazine added, “his is music that embraces paradoxes—large-scale structural clarity with irregular rhythms and harmonic ephemerality, for instance—formed by a musical vision that seems to value both capriciousness and balance. It is challenging music, in the very best sense, but immediately appealing for the sense of wonder it creates. It is often intensely beautiful, and otherworldly, and impressionistic in its evocation of emotions.”

His most recent works are Quatre états d’âme, a work for the New York new music ensemble counter)induction, and Letter for a Dying Soldier for the University of Niš Choir, which is based on a letter Walt Whitman wrote for a soldier in a Union hospital. Currently, he is composing a concerto for the French cellist Xavier Phillips.

Awards and recognition
Mertl is full-time Visiting Artist of Composition at the Setnor School of Music at Syracuse University. He has degrees from Yale University (BA 1991) and the Eastman School of Music (Ph.D. in Music Composition 2005) and has been composer-in-residence at The Ragdale Foundation (August 2008), the Virginia Center for the Creative Arts (Fall 2007), at the I-Park Artists Enclave in East Haddam, CT (July 2006, May 2008, September 2009), and at the Chamber Music Festival of the East at Bennington College in Vermont (2001). He has won major awards such as the Chicago Symphony's First Hearing Award and a 1998 Tanglewood Composition Fellowship. At Tanglewood, he studied with Henri Dutilleux and Mauricio Kagel.

List of Compositions

Letter for a Dying Soldier (2016) for a cappella SSAATTBB chorus, dur. 7 minutes. 
commissioned by and written for Zoran Stanisavljević and the University of Niš Choir.
a letter written by Walt Whitman for a dying soldier at the end of the American Civil War.

Quatre états d'âme (2015-2016) for clarinet, violoncello and piano, duration 30 minutes. 
Commissioned by and written for counter) induction. 
Premiere February 2, 2016, The Sheen Center for Thought and Culture, New York, NY.

The Way Things Are (2013) for flute and piano, dur. 15 minutes.
Commissioned by the University of Oregon. 
Written for David Riley and Molly Barth.

On To Stillness (2013) for mezzo-soprano, oboe, guitar and percussion, dur. 27 minutes.
Commissioned by CSMTA for their 2013 Conference.
A cycle of songs on poetry by Georg Trakl as translated by Stephen Tapscott.
Written for Kirsten Sollek, Anna Hendrickson, and Kenneth Meyer.
Premiere June 29, 2013, Fairfield University, Fairfield, CT.

Gathering What Is To Be Told (2012-2013) for mezzo-soprano and guitar, dur. 32 minutes.
Written for Kirsten Sollek and Kenneth Meyer, voice and guitar.
A song cycle on poems by Keats, Shakespeare, Simic, Berry and Tagore. 
Premiere TBA, July 2013.

Offertory (2010) for cello and piano, dur. 4 minutes.
Written for cellist Florent Renard-Payen.
Premiered November 6, 2010 at Expressiones, New London, CT.

Little Ant Got Hurt "Der kleinen Ameise tat's weh" (2010) for clarinet, bassoon, contrabass and narrator. Duration 15 minutes.
Based on the 2008 work on a Czech children's tale. In German, Czech and English translations.
for members of the ensemble "Die Reihe".

Piano Concerto (2008-2010) for piano and symphonic winds, duration 43 minutes.
Commissioned by the Barlow Endowment for Music Composition and written for Solungga Liu and the
University of Minnesota Symphonic Wind Ensemble, Craig Kirchhoff, conductor. 
Apám emlékére.

Little Ant Got Hurt Polámal Se Mraveneček (2008) A Czech children’s tale for solo oboe, duration 14 minutes.
Written for oboist Marlen Vavřikovà for performance at the Ostrava Oboe Festival, 2009.
Premiered May 2009 Ostrava University, Czech Republic.

Pears on a Sill (2007) for solo piano, dur. 13 min.
in 4 movements: 3 a.m. Nightingale; Spinning Waltz; Boatman’s Song; Caitlyn’s Goodbye.
dedicated to Anne Modugno and written for pianist Solungga Liu
Premiered April 2009 National Concert Hall Taipei, Taiwan.

A Seeker’s Song (2006) for solo guitar, duration 9 minutes.
Commissioned by Kenneth Meyer with partial funding from the Hanson Institute.
Premiered November 8, 2006 by Kenneth Meyer, Syracuse University, Syracuse, NY.

À l’écoute (2005) for 2 oboes and harpsichord, dur. 15 min.
Commissioned for the Ostrava Oboe Festival, Ostrava, Czech Republic.
Premiered November 25, 2005 by Marlen Vavrikova and Richard Killmer, Ostrava University.

Madra’s Musings (2005) for flute, viola and harp. dur. 10 min.
Written for janus.
Premiered January 31, 2007 by janus, Weill Recital Hall, Carnegie Hall, New York City.

Fanfare to an Open Sky (2003) for 3 trumpets, 4 horns, 2 trombones, tuba and timpani, dur. 3 min.
Premiered November 2003, Central College, Iowa.

Aria (2003) for oboe, violin, viola and cello, dur. 11 min.
Commissioned by Alice Caplow-Sparks.
Premiered April 12, 2003, Eastman School of Music.

Love, Play On (2002) for wind ensemble, duration 24 min.
Commissioned by the Big Ten University Wind Ensembles.
Premiered April 25, 2003, Northwestern University.

Pandora’s Beethoven-Box (2001) for orchestra, dur. 10 min.
Commissioned by the Phoenix Symphony for its 2002 Beethoven Festival
Premiered January 31, 2002 in Symphony Hall, Phoenix, AZ.
The Phoenix Symphony, Hermann Michael, conductor.

for inspiration hath no society with reason (2001) for woodwind quintet, dur. 6 min.
Commissioned by the Chamber Music Festival of the East.
Premiered August 11, 2001 at Bennington College, Bennington, VT.

Lover Calls (2001) for seven cellos (also transcribed for six cellos and bass), dur. 7 min.
Commissioned by the Tarab Cello Ensemble.
Premiered May 12, 2001 at the Merryall Center for the Arts, New Milford, CT.

Evocations of an Earthly Nature (2000) for orchestra, dur. 15 min.
Commissioned by ASCAP and the Rhode Island Philharmonic in honor of the
Aaron Copland Centenary.
Premiered June 16, 2000 in Jordan Hall, New England Conservatory, Boston.
Rhode Island Philharmonic, Larry Rachleff, conductor.

Afterglow of a Kiss (2000) for solo flute and large chamber ensemble, dur. 7 min.
Premiered February 29, 2000 in Kilbourn Hall, Eastman School of Music:
Composers’ Sinfonietta, Alyce Johnson, flute, David Gilbert, conductor.

Recitative to an Absent Sky (1999) for solo cello, dur. 6 min.
Premiered February 4, 2000 in Kilbourn Hall, Eastman School of Music:
Florent Renard-Payen, cello.

A Spell of Myriad Dances (1999) for orchestra, dur. 15 min.
Paul Jacobs Memorial Fund Commission by the Tanglewood Music Center.
Premiered July 26, 1999 during the Contemporary Music Festival, Ozawa Hall.
Tanglewood Music Center Orchestra, Stefan Asbury, conductor.

Trio & Consort (1999) for English horn, seven oboes and percussion, dur. 13 min.
Commissioned by Richard Killmer.
Premiered August 12, 1999 at the International Double Reed Society Conference, Madison, WI.
Richard Killmer, Anna Hendrickson, Andrea Gross, and Eastman oboe choir.

Sculpted Memory (1998) for chamber orchestra, dur. 10 min.
Commissioned by the Fairbanks Symphony.
Premiered January 30, 1999 in Davis Hall, University of Alaska at Fairbanks.
Arctic Chamber Orchestra, Madeline Schatz, conductor.

Quatre Aperçus (1998) for mezzo-soprano, clarinet and piano, dur. 13 min.
Premiered February 4, 1999 in Kilbourn Hall, Eastman School of Music.
Kirsten Sollek-Avella, Anthony Franco, David Riley.

Empress (1998) for large chamber ensemble, dur. 12 min.
Premiered July 19, 1998 in Ozawa Hall, Tanglewood, MA.
Tanglewood Fellows, Stefan Asbury, conductor.

Spiralcycle (1998) for tape, dur. 21 min.
Premiered April 16, 1998 in Tuttle Theater, SUNY Brockport, NY.
Augusto Soledade, choreographer.

But the Stars Are Slower Still (1997) for orchestra, dur. 18 min.
Premiered February 2, 1998 in Orchestra Hall, Chicago, IL
Chicago Civic Orchestra, Cilff Colnot, conductor.

Souffle et Contresouffle (1996) for piano, dur. 9 min.
Premiered February 17, 1997 in Kilbourn Hall, Eastman School of Music.
Stephen Perry, piano.

Pavane en forme de voûte (1996) for oboe and string orchestra, dur. 10 min.
Premiered December 12, 1996 in Kilbourn Hall, Eastman School of Music.
Anna Hendrickson, oboe and Eastman Strings, David Phillips, conductor.

References
 Counter)induction composer/performer collective
 Kalvos and Damian's New Music Bazaar
 Counter)induction New York Times Music Review

External links
 

1969 births
American male classical composers
American classical composers
Contemporary classical music performers
21st-century classical composers
20th-century classical composers
Living people
Place of birth missing (living people)
Yale University alumni
Eastman School of Music alumni
21st-century American composers
20th-century American composers
20th-century American male musicians
21st-century American male musicians